Take a Girl Like You is a comic novel by Kingsley Amis. The narrative follows the progress of twenty-year-old Jenny Bunn, who has moved from her family home in the North of England to a small town not far from London to teach primary school children. Jenny is a 'traditional' Northern working-class girl whose dusky beauty strikes people as being at odds with the old-fashioned values she has gained from her upbringing, not least the conviction of 'no sex before marriage'. A thread of the  novel concerns the frustrations of the morally dubious Patrick Standish, a 30-year-old teacher at a local private secondary school and his attempts to seduce Jenny; all this occurs against a backdrop of Jenny's new teaching job, Patrick's work and his leisure time with flatmate and colleague Graham and their new acquaintance, the well-off and somewhat older man-about-town, Julian Ormerod.

Plot
The novel opens with Jenny Bunn's arrival at her lodging-house. She's a young, strikingly beautiful, Northern girl who has moved to a small town outside London, to take her first teaching job. Jenny has rented a room in the home of middle-aged couple, Dick and Martha Thompson. Dick is apparently some sort of auctioneer and Martha is a housewife, who is bored, cynical and at times openly hostile towards young Jenny. Anna, the Thompsons' other lodger, is a changeable young woman who is apparently French.

Within half an hour of her arrival, Jenny meets Patrick Standish, an acquaintance of the Thompsons, who wastes no time in asking if he can ring her to arrange a date. Patrick takes Jenny to what she sees as a fashionable, upmarket Italian restaurant [but which Amis describes as a classless provincial pseudo-Italianate place]. Bowled over by Patrick's charm, Jenny accompanies him in his noisy sports car to the flat he shares with teaching colleague, Graham, who is, by Patrick's arrangement, not at home. A cosy session of listening to gramophone records and kissing (enough for Jenny on a first date) develops at Patrick's behest into heavy petting, which Patrick takes for granted will lead to the bedroom. Jenny is adamant and pulls his hair to make him stop. Jenny explains, to Patrick's wonderment, that she is and intends to remain a virgin until she is married.

The rest of the novel relates, from Jenny's point of view, the progress of her relationship with Patrick, her activities as a new teacher, getting to know the people around her, and a string of incidents such as a visit to Julian's house, a date with Graham and Dick making a clumsy pass at her in the kitchen.

From Patrick's point of view are described his activities at school, his outlook on life and the escapades that follow becoming acquainted with the urbane Julian Ormerod, who has a big house in the countryside near the town. A lengthy section of the book is assigned to a trip with Julian to London, which includes a trawl around the strip-clubs of Soho, a visit to the apartment of two of Julian's lady friends, followed by a night on the town for the four of them, in which Patrick has too much to drink.

For a time, Jenny and Patrick enjoy a carefree period of 'going steady' but this is not enough for Patrick, who finds himself sexually frustrated. In the end, he gives Jenny an ultimatum: either she has sex with him or the relationship is over, and Jenny says she will. Patrick, after ensuring the absence of Graham, waits for her to come to his flat but she doesn't arrive. So Patrick has sex with a girl who, after Jenny's no-show, happens to knock on his door, a girl who is not only a schoolgirl but is also his headmaster's daughter.

It would now appear that Patrick and Jenny have broken up, but at a boozy and somewhat riotous party at Julian's house, Patrick takes advantage, in the early hours, of a tired and sozzled Jenny in one of the guest bedrooms. Julian is disapproving of Patrick's behaviour and is sympathetic to Jenny, who is at first very upset and says she never wants to see Patrick again. Later in the day, presumably because of her feelings for him, Jenny accepts what has happened as inevitable. There is no obvious 'happy ever after'.

[Many years later, Amis published a sequel, set a few years later, Difficulties with Girls, in which Patrick and Jenny are married, not yet (to Jenny's disappointment) with children, and Patrick still has an actively roving eye.]

Style
Amis's style, in common with that of other mid-twentieth century writers but in contrast to that of writers like James, Woolf and Joyce, has been described as "neo-realist". Rabinovitz writes of these neo-realist writers that

To bring the world of the novel as close as possible to the physical world of the reader, Amis takes great care to describe in great detail, in what appear to be a series of entirely incidental details; for example, the minutiae of the lodging house are meticulously (and humorously) described:

The plot of Take a Girl Like You follows traditional realistic conventions and has been compared to that of Clarissa (Samuel Richardson, 1748). Like Clarissa, Jenny Bunn is young, beautiful and virtuous and attempts to defend her virginity, whilst providing an opportunity for the next assault.

Film 
Take a Girl Like You was filmed in 1970, directed by Jonathan Miller from an adaptation by George Melly. It starred Hayley Mills, Oliver Reed, Sheila Hancock, Ronald Lacey, John Bird, Noel Harrison, Aimi MacDonald and Penelope Keith. A three part television series adapted by Andrew Davies was made in 2000.

References

Sources
 Farce and Society: The Range of Kingsley Amis, R. B. Parker, Wisconsin Studies in Contemporary Literature, Vol. 2, No. 3 (Autumn, 1961), pp. 27–38

1960 British novels
Novels by Kingsley Amis
Novels set in London
Victor Gollancz Ltd books
British novels adapted into films
British novels adapted into television shows